The 1998 Texas Longhorns football team represented the University of Texas at Austin during the 1998 NCAA Division I-A football season. They were represented in the Big 12 Conference in the South Division. They played their home games at Darrell K Royal–Texas Memorial Stadium in Austin, Texas. The team was coached by head coach Mack Brown.

Regular season
Ricky Williams had a sensational senior season, highlighted by rushing for nine touchdowns and 385 yards in the season's first two games; rushing for 318 yards and six touchdowns against Rice; rushing for 350 yards and five touchdowns against Iowa State; and rushing for 150 yards against Nebraska's legendary Blackshirts defense. He also helped beat longtime rival Oklahoma rushing for 166 rushing yards and two scores.

Williams broke the career rushing record during the annual rivalry game held the day after Thanksgiving (this particular year fell on November 27, 1998) between Texas and Texas A&M. Needing only 63 yards to break Tony Dorsett's 22-year-old NCAA Division I-A all-time rushing record (6,082), Ricky Williams approached the line of scrimmage with 1:45 seconds left in the first quarter having already rushed for 54 yards. At first and ten on the Texas forty yard line, quarterback Major Applewhite handed off to Williams who broke two tackles, sprinted into open field and received a down field block from receiver Wane McGarity for a 60-yard touchdown run and the record. Williams' record-breaking run gave Texas a 10–0 lead in its eventual 26–24 upset of sixth-ranked Texas A&M. He finished the game racking up 295 yards. He also broke the NCAA Division I-A career rushing touchdowns and career scoring records in 1998 with 73 and 452 respectively (topped one year later by Miami University's Travis Prentice), and rushed for 200 or more yards in twelve different games (an NCAA record he shares with Dayne and USC's Marcus Allen). Williams won the 64th Heisman Trophy, becoming the second Texas Longhorn to win this honor, joining Earl Campbell.
Williams was sometimes known as the "Texas Tornado."

Schedule
The Longhorns finished the regular season with an 8–3 record and defeated #25 Mississippi State in the 1999 Cotton Bowl Classic, 38–11.

1998 team players in the NFL
The following players were drafted into professional football following the season.

Game summaries

at #5 Kansas State

Kansas State welcomed Texas for their first Big 12 Conference matchup, and first meeting since 1942, and Texas' first trip to Manhattan since 1926.  1998 Heisman Trophy winner Ricky Williams was held to just 43 yards on 25 carries for an average of just 1.7 yards per carry.  He did not score in the game.  Williams averaged 202 rushing yards per game in 1998 and was held to a season low 43 years, his next lowest yardage output was 90 yards against Oklahoma State.  K-State racked up 223 yards on the ground on 51 carries and the Wildcats won handily, 48–7.

Awards and honors
Ricky Williams, Heisman Trophy
Ricky Williams, Walter Camp Award
Ricky Williams, Maxwell Award
Ricky Williams, Doak Walker Award
Ricky Williams, Consensus All-American

References

Texas
Texas Longhorns football seasons
Cotton Bowl Classic champion seasons
Texas Longhorns football